Odder Idræts- og Gymnastikforening is a Danish football club currently playing in the Denmark Series, the fifth tier of Danish football. They play at Spektrum Park in Odder, Jutland, which has a capacity of 1,000.

History
In the spring of 1899, a small group of people formed Odder IGF in Odder, the "largest village in Denmark". Since, the club mostly played in the lower divisions of Danish football. 

In 1993, club chairman Bent Villumsen laid out plans for securing the future success of Odder IGF. These plans came to fruition in 2013, when Odder IGF promoted to the Danish 2nd Division – the third tier in the Danish football system – for the first time in the club's 114 year history. The historical promotion occurred under Villumsen's successor as chairman, Peter Lindberg Christensen, who had laid out the future plans for the club together alongside Villumsen in 1993.

One of the more remarkable events in club history occurred before the famed promotion. More specifically on 25 August 2010, as Odder IGF reached the second round of the Danish Cup and drew AGF, the largest team in the region. Almost 2,500 spectators had come to Spektrum Park to see the local side lose 0–1 to AGF after a goal in stoppage time by Casper Sloth.

On the last day of the 2018–19 season, Odder IGF suffered relegation to the Denmark Series after a 2–2 draw against Vejgaard BK. This meant that six consecutive seasons in the Danish 2nd Division came to an end.

Honours
Denmark Series (fourth tier)

 Runners-up (1): 2012–13 (promotion)

References

External links
 Official site

 
Football clubs in Denmark
Association football clubs established in 1899